Lieutenant-General Sir Launcelot Edward Kiggell,  (2 October 1862 – 23 February 1954) was an Irish-born British Army officer who was Chief of the General Staff (CGS) for the British Armies in France under Field Marshal Sir Douglas Haig from late 1915 to 1918.

Early life and military career
Kiggell was born in County Limerick on 2 October 1862, son of Launcelot John Kiggell (1829–1911), a Justice of the Peace and Major in the Cork Light Militia. He attended the Royal Military College, Sandhurst, and was commissioned into the Royal Warwickshire Regiment as a lieutenant on 10 May 1882.

He was Adjutant of the 2nd battalion 1886–90 and was promoted captain on 3 April 1889. He attended Staff College, Camberley from 1893 until December 1894. He was then an instructor at Sandhurst from 1895 to 1897. From 1897 to 1899 he was Deputy Assistant Adjutant-General (DAAG) at South-Eastern District, and he was promoted to major on 6 April 1898.

He served in South Africa throughout the Second Boer War. From late 1899 he served on the staff of General Sir Redvers Buller, then spent six months on the staff at HQ at Pretoria. He was promoted to brevet lieutenant-colonel on 29 November 1900. He then served as Assistant Adjutant-General (AAG) for Harrissmith District, then held the same post in Natal after the end of the war. He was Mentioned in Despatches. After the war had ended, he returned to the United Kingdom in August 1902.

From 1904 to 1907 he was Deputy Assistant Adjutant-General (DAAG) at Staff College, Camberley. In 1905 he presented a paper to the Aldershot Military Society, which was criticised for excessive emphasis on the lessons of the Napoleonic and Franco-Prussian Wars rather than the more recent Boer and Russo-Japanese Wars. He wrote a revised edition of Edward Hamley's Operations of War. He wanted to change the name of Staff College to the "War School" and to train commanders rather than just staff officers, a view which he shared with Rawlinson, Robertson and Haig.

He was a General Staff Officer (GSO1) at Horse Guards (Army Headquarters) from 1907 to 1909. He was awarded the CB in 1908. He was then Brigadier-General in charge of Administration at Scottish Command from March to October 1909. He was Director of Staff Duties at the War Office from 1909 to 1913, in succession to Haig, of whom he was something of a protégé. He was considered as a successor for Henry Wilson as Commandant of Staff College in 1910, but the post went to Robertson; instead he succeeded Robertson as Commandant in 1913. J F C Fuller, a student at Staff College at the time, saw Kiggell as "a highly educated soldier, but a doctrinaire … he possessed knowledge, but little vision … a dyspeptic, gloomy and doleful man".

First World War
He served in World War I as Director of Military Training at the War Office from 1914, as Director of Home Defence at the War Office from later that year until 1915. He served briefly as Deputy Chief of the Imperial General Staff at the end of 1915.

When Sir Douglas Haig was promoted to Commander-in-Chief of the BEF in December 1915, Kiggell was appointed Chief of General Staff to the BEF. Richard Butler, Haig's preferred choice, was considered too junior for the role. Kiggell would hold this position until early 1918. Kiggell was awarded the KCB in 1916. On 1 January 1917, he was promoted to temporary Lieutenant-General. Wilson, liaising with French Grand Quartier General early in 1917, claimed that Kiggell "hated the French".

Nigel Cave exonerates Kiggell from some of the questionable decisions which are sometimes attributed to him. Kiggell's stress on high-morale infantry attacks cannot be blamed for the catastrophe of the First Day of the Somme, as an infantry advance in straight lines was only one of the formations suggested in Rawlinson's Fourth Army Tactical Notes and modern research has shown that it was not widely adopted. By contrast, the decision to prolong the Third Ypres Campaign into the wet weather of November 1917 (to capture the high ground of Passchendaele Ridge) and to postpone the initially more successful Cambrai Offensive from 20 September until November, were ultimately taken by Haig rather than by Kiggell. Nigel Cave writes that Haig was highly critical of what he perceived as unsatisfactory performance, even in such senior generals as Rawlinson (in 1915) and Plumer (in 1916), and that it is therefore unlikely that he would have retained Kiggell's services had he not been up to the job. Cave writes that Kiggell was "a solid effective administrator" and "basically sound and capable" but that "it is questionable whether he should have been allowed to carry on for so long". He is quoted, on seeing a flooded trench, as saying "Why wasn't I told it was like this".

Along with a number of other senior officers at GHQ in the winter of 1917–18, including Butler and John Charteris, Kiggell was removed from his position, as a result of political pressure from Prime Minister David Lloyd George. He was a scapegoat following the failure of allied forces to achieve a decisive result at the Battle of Passchendaele and the German counterattack which retook almost all the British gains at Cambrai. However, he had not taken the leave which he was due, and two doctors testified that he was genuinely suffering from nervous exhaustion.

Later life
Kiggell was awarded the KCMG in 1918. He was Lieutenant Governor of Guernsey from 1918 until 1920, in which year he retired from the Army.

Kiggell worked on the Official History of the Great War from 1920 to 1923, but had to give up the task on health grounds. In 1924 he was appointed to write the volume of the Official History covering January 1918 to 21 March 1918, the period up until and including the first day of German Michael Offensive. As the blame for this near-debacle was politically controversial, it was planned to produce this volume quickly, like the volume on Gallipoli. British Army record-keeping had broken down during the chaotic days of the German breakthrough, so Kiggell was deemed an ideal person to interview officers who had served at the time, but in 1926 he was dismissed as he had made little progress, and what he had written was deemed “colourless”. As Aspinall-Oglander was busy writing the Gallipoli volume, Edmonds took over writing the volume himself; which in the event was not published until 1935 as he was busy with the Somme volume.

Kiggell had married Eleanor Rose Field, daughter of a colonel, on 10 March 1888. They had three sons, born in 1890, 1894 and 1903. His wife died in 1948.

Kiggell died, after a thirty-year retirement, at Felixstowe on 23 February 1954. His estate was valued for probate at £2,286 1s 3d (just over £56,000 at 2016 prices).

References

Books

, essay on Kiggell written by Nigel Cave.
 

|-

|-

1862 births
1954 deaths
Royal Warwickshire Fusiliers officers
British Army lieutenant generals
Knights Commander of the Order of the Bath
Knights Commander of the Order of St Michael and St George
Academics of the Royal Military College, Sandhurst
British Army personnel of the Second Boer War
British Army generals of World War I
Military personnel from County Limerick
Graduates of the Staff College, Camberley
Graduates of the Royal Military College, Sandhurst
Commandants of the Staff College, Camberley
Academics of the Staff College, Camberley